Images of Curtis Fuller is an album by jazz trombonist Curtis Fuller, released in 1960 on the Savoy label.

Reception

AllMusic awarded the album 4 stars.

Track listing
All compositions by Curtis Fuller
"Accident" - 4:12
"Darryl's Minor" - 5:30
"Be Back Ta-Reckla" - 7:00
"Judyful" - 8:55
"New Date" - 5:00
"Accident" [take 3] - 4:23 Bonus track on CD reissue
"Darryl's Minor" [take 2] - 6:12 Bonus track
"New Date" [take 1] - 6:25 Bonus track on CD reissue
Recorded at Van Gelder Studio, Engelwood Cliffs on June 6 (tracks 5 & 8) and June 7 (tracks 1-4, 6 & 7), 1960

Personnel 
 Curtis Fuller - trombone
 McCoy Tyner - piano
 Wilbur Harden - trumpet
 Yusef Lateef - tenor saxophone, flute
 Lee Morgan - trumpet (tracks 1-4 & 6-7)
 Jimmy Garrison (tracks 5 & 8), Milt Hinton (tracks 1-4 & 6-7) - bass
 Bobby Donaldson (tracks 1-4 & 6-7), Clifford Jarvis (tracks 5 & 8) - drums

References 

1960 albums
Curtis Fuller albums
Savoy Records albums
Albums recorded at Van Gelder Studio